"Rubini" is a song by Italian singer Mahmood, with featured vocals by Elisa.

The song was written by Mahmoood, Dardust and Elisa, and produced by Dardust. It was included in Mahmood's second album Ghettolimpo and released as a radio single on 27 August 2021 by Island Records.

Background and composition 
The song, written and composed by the singer-songwriter with Elisa, tells the story of Mahmood's youth seen through the eyes of an adult: a troubled time in the family, the first relationships, the first adventures with friends.

Mahmood spoke about the creative process behind Elisa's composition:Elisa spoke about the meaning of the collaboration:

Personnel 
Credits adapted from Tidal.
 Dardust – producer, composer
 Mahmood – associated performer, author, vocals
 Elisa – associated performer, author, vocals

Charts

Certifications

References

2021 singles
2021 songs
Island Records singles
Mahmood (singer) songs
Elisa (Italian singer) songs
Songs written by Dario Faini
Songs written by Mahmood
Songs written by Elisa (Italian singer)